Natalya Karimova (born 28 February 1974) is a Russian cyclist. She competed at the 1996 Summer Olympics and the 2000 Summer Olympics.

References

External links
 

1974 births
Living people
Russian female cyclists
Olympic cyclists of Russia
Cyclists at the 1996 Summer Olympics
Cyclists at the 2000 Summer Olympics
Place of birth missing (living people)